Miguel Neto (proper : Miguel Gaspar Neto or Miguel Gaspar Fernandes Neto) was the ambassador of Angola to South Africa. He was appointed ambassador by Jose Eduardo dos Santos in 2005.  As of 2011, Neto vacated this position having had a "farewell meeting" with Baleka Mbete (chairman of the ANC) in which he talked about the good and long standing relationship between Angola and South Africa. As of 2012, Neto is the current Angolan ambassador to the United Kingdom and Ireland.
In 1984 President Jose Eduardo dos Santos appointed Miguel Gaspar Neto as Angola's Ambassador to Zaire. 
Miguel Neto was Angola's second Ambassador to Zaire since the establishment of diplomatic relations between the two countries in 1978.

References

Ambassadors of Angola to the United Kingdom
Ambassadors of Angola to South Africa
Ambassadors of Angola to Ireland
Ambassadors of Angola to the Democratic Republic of the Congo
Living people
Year of birth missing (living people)